Senator Ada may refer to:

Joseph Franklin Ada (born 1943), Senate of Guam
Tom Ada (born 1949), Senate of Guam